The chapters of Enchanter are written and illustrated by Izumi Kawachi. The manga started serialisation in Square Enix's manga magazine, Monthly Gangan Wing in October 2002. Square Enix released the first tankōbon of the manga on January 27, 2003. Nine-teen tankōbon volumes have been released in Japan with the 19th volume released on March 27, 2009. The manga is licensed in North America by Digital Manga Publishing. Digital Manga Publishing released the first tankōbon volume on July 1, 2006. Ten tankōbon volumes have been released in North America with the 10th volume released on February 25, 2009.

Protagonist Haruhiko Kanou, a regular high school student, meets Eukanaria, a demon, during her quest to find a body for her late lover, Fulcanelli. Coincidentally, Eukanaria looks very similar to Yuka Fujikawa, Kanou's next door neighbour and teacher.



Volume list

References

Enchanter